Conrad Mathias Berg (25 or 27 April 1785 – 13 or 14 December 1852) was a French composer, writer on music, and piano teacher from Alsace.

Life
Berg was born in Colmar. After learning music and violin in his hometown, he spent the years 1804 and 1805 in Mannheim where he received lessons from Ferdinand Fränzl for this instrument. Although his father had intended him to be a violinist, Berg always preferred the piano. He went to Paris and entered the Conservatoire where he spent the years 1806–1807. According to other sources, Berg was admitted but did not enter. He moved to Strasbourg in 1808, where he taught music, and became known as a composer, writer and music critic. He concertised in Vienna (1817) and several times in Paris, the last time in 1851. In 1824, he travelled to Darmstadt to learn the teaching method of Christian Heinrich Rinck.

He has written works for piano (three concertos, sonatas, variations, ten piano trios, etc., four-handed pieces), four string quartets.

In 1832, Berg established the Société pour les artistes émérites et infirmes.

Works
.

References

External links
 
  Dommer, Arrey von, "Berg, Konrad Matthias" in: Allgemeine Deutsche Biographie 2 (1875), p. 364
 Berg, Konrad Matthaus on musicsack.com

1785 births
1852 deaths
19th-century French composers
19th-century French musicians
19th-century French male musicians
Conservatoire de Paris alumni
French Romantic composers
People from Colmar